The Albert premetro station is an underground tram station located on the border between the municipalities of Saint-Gilles and Forest in Brussels, Belgium. The station is at the crossroad between the Avenue Albert/Albertlaan on the greater ring road and the Chaussée d'Alsemberg/Alsembergsesteenweg between the Forest park and the Saint-Gilles prison. The station is the last stop south of the North-South Axis, a tram tunnel crossing Brussels city center from Albert to the Brussels-North railway station. It is on tram routes 3 and 4 and evening route 33. There is a connection at ground level with tram route 51 as well as bus routes 48 and 54.

External links
STIB/MIVB official website

Brussels metro stations
Forest, Belgium
Saint-Gilles, Belgium